Chachani is a volcanic group in southern Peru,  northwest of the city of Arequipa. It consists of several lava domes and individual volcanoes such as Nocarane, along with lava shields such as the Airport Domes. Underneath Chachani lies a caldera.

During the Pliocene and early Pleistocene, the volcanic group produced large ignimbrites such as the La Joya, Arequipa Airport and Yura Tuff ignimbrites; afterwards the volcanic group proper grew in the caldera until about 56,500 years ago. There have not been any eruptions during historical time, but the volcano is considered to be only dormant and due to its closeness to the city of Arequipa is considered high risk.

Name 

The name means "brave" in Aymara or "mountain of man"/"mountain of male"; alternative spellings "Cacheni" and "Charchani" are also known.

Geography and geomorphology 

It is considered to be one of the most easily climbed mountains between 6,000 - 7,000 m high, although acclimatization and good physical health are required to ascend it.

Volcanoes in the southern part of Peru include from north to south Auquihuato, Firura, Coropuna, Andagua volcanic field, Sabancaya, Ampato, Chachani, El Misti, Pichu Pichu, Ubinas which has erupted intermittently since 1954, Huaynaputina where a large eruption occurred in 1600, Ticsani, Tutupaca, Yucamane and Casiri. Some of these volcanoes are among the highest in the world, and on average, there is one eruption of a Peruvian volcano every 13 years. The Peruvian volcanoes are part of the Central Volcanic Zone of the Andes, one of three separate volcanic belts in that mountain chain; the Central Volcanic Zone contains 44 named stratovolcanoes.

La Horqueta has a young appearance and resembles an ash cone with a crater. In total, Chachani is made up of more than 12 edifices.

The Colorado lava domes which are also known as Cerro Penones in turn are located northwest from Nocarane. The El Misti volcano later arose on the margin of the Chachani caldera, where it intersects the border of the Altiplano.

Glacial erosion and landslides have affected the volcanic complex, forming cirques and U-shaped valleys and removing much of the original shape of the individual volcanoes. Some moraines have been overrun by lava flows.

Chachani drains into the Rio Chili. The Quebrada Canchero, Quebrada Cabrería and Quebrada Traccra drain south to eastward into the river which flows around the southeastern side of Chachani and has cut a canyon between Chachani and El Misti. The Rio Sumbay, one of its tributaries, runs along the eastern side of Chachani. The Rio Yura flows southward along the western side of Chachani, and upon reaching the then westward-flowing Rio Chili becomes the Rio Vitor, which eventually discharges into the Pacific Ocean together with the Rio Siguas.

Glaciation 

The volcano underwent five stages of glaciation in the past. During the last glacial maximum extensive glaciers formed well-developed moraines at  elevation; lateral moraines marking the limit of glaciation are located at  elevation on the southern flank. Glaciers may have also formed during the Little Ice Age, where there are moraines at  elevation; presently however the mountain lacks glaciers and only has a snowfield. In general, glaciers in the tropical Andes have been shrinking after the end of the Little Ice Age, and especially after the 1970s.

Some of them (about six in total) are still active and are located above  elevation, while the lowest inactive ones end at  elevation. Permafrost is expected to be continuous above  with discontinuous occurrence above . Other periglacial phenomena such as needle ice are also encountered on the volcanic complex.

Geology 

In the Andes, volcanism is distributed between three volcanic belts, the Northern Volcanic Zone, the Central Volcanic Zone and the Southern Volcanic Zone which coincide with segments where the downgoing Nazca plate falls steeply into the mantle.

Volcanic activity in the Chachani region appears to have begun during the Cretaceous-Paleocene in the form of the "Toquepala" volcanics. The oldest volcanic rocks of the Western Cordillera are known under the name "Tacaza", and underwent erosion and folding before the next phase which is known as "Sillapaca". Finally, during the Miocene-Quaternary the Sencca Formation and the "Barroso" volcanics developed; Chachani is classified as part of the Barroso volcanics although the oldest volcanism might belong to the "Sillapaca" unit.

The terrain of the volcano is formed by volcanic rocks of Eocene to recent age, which overlie a Precambrian basement and include widespread Neogene-Quaternary ignimbrites. Chachani straddles the margin between the higher-elevation Altiplano and the Arequipa basin at lower altitude.

The younger El Misti volcano lies southeast of Chachani, across the Rio Chili. Other volcanoes in the region are Ampato and Jollojello northwest, Baquetane, Hucullani and Nevado Calcha north, Yanarico east and Pichu Pichu southeast from Chachani. Of these, Misti, Pichu Pichu and Chachani are aligned on normal faults that trend northwest–southeast and has been active during the Holocene.

Chachani has erupted andesite and dacite, which define a potassium-rich calc-alkaline suite with unusual adakite characteristics; adakites are magmas that form when the downgoing plate in a subduction setting melts. Phenocrysts include augite, biotite, hornblende and hypersthene; the rhyolites of the Arequipa ignimbrites additionally contain ilmenite, magnetite, plagioclase, quartz and sanidine. The composition of the volcanic rocks has varied over the lifespan of Chachani, sometimes rocks of basaltic andesite composition were erupted as well while the younger volcanoes are usually more homogeneous; this was paralleled by a decrease in the eruption rate.

Climate and vegetation 

Under the influence of the cold Humboldt Current and the subtropical ridge, the region features an arid climate with less than  annual precipitation in Arequipa. The diurnal temperature range is large and can reach , while ground temperatures are much more stable and higher than air temperatures.

From  elevation cacti, herbs, Peruvian feather grass, yareta but also lichens and mosses grow on the slopes of Chachani and other regional volcanoes. Vegetation is scarce to absent above  elevation, and much of its lower slopes were stripped of their vegetation during the colonial era. The dry soils are not suitable for agriculture. Part of the volcano is in the Salinas y Aguada Blanca National Reserve.

Eruption history 

The oldest volcanic formations linked to Chachani are the so-called "sillars", which are rhyolitic pyroclastic flows/ignimbrites containing pumice beds. These ignimbrites include the La Joya Ignimbrite of Pliocene age, the Plio-Quaternary Arequipa Airport Ignimbrite and the Quaternary Yura Tuff and Capillune Formation. The  4.8 million years old La Joya, the  1.65 million years old Arequipa Airport, and less certainly the  early Pleistocene Yura Tuff as well as the Capillune Formation ignimbrites appear to have been erupted by Chachani or (in the case of the Yura Tuff) from a vent north of it. Together with lava flows these form the "Pre-Chachani" units and probably are the largest eruptions experienced by Chachani.

They occur in the wider region of Chachani and crop out in the Arequipa area and in river valleys. Their emplacement took place in the form of fast-moving hot streams of rock. An additional ignimbrite is the 13 million years old Miocene Rio Chili Ignimbrite; the vents of the Miocene units are unknown and the Rio Chili Ignimbrite appears to be related to the Huaylillas Ignimbrite of southern Peru.

Later, during the Quaternary the Chachani volcanic complex grew in the caldera. The older activity formed the older volcanoes Chingana northeast, Estribo east and Nocarane north of Chachani as well as the Colorado lava domes north-northwest from Nocarane and the volcanoes Chachani Base and El Angel; argon-argon dating has yielded ages ranging between 1,000,000 - 500,000 years ago for these volcanoes. Later the volcanoes El Rodado, La Horqueta and Chachani ( 130,000 - 131,000 years ago) formed as a west–east alignment, along with the Uyupampa lava field (about 230,000 - 280,000 years ago) far west from Chachani, the Airport Domes south (between 290,000 - 400,000 years ago), the Cabrería lava domes south-southeast and the Volcancillo dome northeast from Chachani.

The youngest reported date of 56,500 ± 31,600 years ago has been obtained on the Cabrería lava domes; formerly the Airport Domes/Los Angeles/Pampa de Palacio were considered to be the youngest and of Holocene age. However, a post-glacial lava flow descends the western slope of Chachani between Chachani and Nocarane and phreatic eruptions may have formed Holocene-age craters on Chachani. No historical eruptions are known at the volcanic complex, and the date of the last activity is likewise unclear.

The existence of solfataras in the summit region and of hot springs at Socosani and Yura has been reported, and frequent seismic activity occurs on Chachani's southwestern flank; this activity may relate to either geothermal or tectonic phenomena. Currently, the volcano is considered to be dormant. Occasionally, mudflows descend its slopes and cause damages at lower elevations.

Hazards 

The city of Arequipa with about one million inhabitants and infrastructure such as the airport, hydropower plants and reservoirs are within range of Chachani and human settlement has spread around its base. In addition, melting ice and snow on the summit could generate mudflows, and pyroclastic flows, lava flows and tephra falls are additional hazards. Chachani is considered to be a high-risk volcano and the Geophysical Institute of Peru in 2018 installed a monitoring station on Chachani. , volcano hazard maps were in preparation and Chachani is monitored with seismometers and tiltmeters. Apart from eruptions, volcano-induced pollution of neighbouring water resources is a concern at Chachani.

Religious importance and archeology 

Chachani is the protector mountain spirit of Cayma The people of Arequipa sometimes refer to Chachani as the "father" of El Misti (Pichu Pichu is the "mother") and ascribed to it the ability to influence the gender of newborn children, making them daughters. The Inca worshipped Chachani and its neighbouring mountains and turned its summit into a mountain sanctuary that was later destroyed by sulfur mining and plundering to the point that no trace of archeological sites can be found, such as e.g. walls.

Mining 

Chachani was reportedly mined for sulfur during the colonial era and for the white "sillar" rocks that were used in construction of the famous buildings of colonial-era Arequipa, which is also known as the "white city".

Notes

References

Sources

Bibliography
 
 Chachani on SummitPost
 "Nevado Chachani, Peru" on Peakbagger
 Chachani on Peakware

External links
 Chachani on Summitpost
Chachani volcano at NASA Earth Observatory, May 1, 2022
 Video of Chachani climb

Stratovolcanoes of Peru
Mountains of Arequipa Region
Andean Volcanic Belt
Mountains of Peru
Quaternary volcanoes
Quaternary South America
Six-thousanders of the Andes